Z Apodis (Z Aps) is a variable star in the constellation of Apus.  It has an apparent visual magnitude which varies between 10.8 and 12.8, over a period of 39.37 days. Although described in the General Catalogue of Variable Stars as a cataclysmic variable star, it appears that it is a pulsating variable star, and has been classed as an RV Tauri variable star, type RVa.  Other sources classify it is a type II (W Virginis) Cepheid.

References

Apus (constellation)
RV Tauri variables
Apodis, Z
J14065484-7122167